Cosgrove is an unincorporated community in Johnson County, Iowa, United States.

History
Cosgrove's population was 26 in 1925.

Notes

Unincorporated communities in Johnson County, Iowa
Unincorporated communities in Iowa